Gene Barry (born Eugene Klass, June 14, 1919 – December 9, 2009) was an American stage, screen, and television actor and singer. Barry is best remembered for his leading roles in the films The Atomic City (1952) and The War of The Worlds (1953) and for his portrayal of the title characters in the TV series Bat Masterson and Burke's Law, among many roles.

Early life
Barry was born Eugene Klass on June 14, 1919, in New York City, the son of Eva (née Conn) and Martin Klass; all of his grandparents were Jewish immigrants from Russia. Barry grew up in Brooklyn and attended New Utrecht High School. Barry exhibited early artistic skills with singing and playing violin as a child and later spent two years at the Chatham Square School of Music in Greenwich Village on a scholarship awarded for his vocal ability.

Career
Barry chose his professional name in honor of John Barrymore and made his Broadway debut as Captain Paul Duval in the 1942 revival of Sigmund Romberg's The New Moon. He later portrayed Falke in Rosalinda (1942), Nova Kovich in The Merry Widow (1943), Lieutenant Bunin in Catherine Was Great (1944), Dorante and Comte De Chateau-Gaillard in The Would-Be Gentleman (1946), The Doctor in Happy as Larry (1950), and played a variety of roles in the musical revue Bless You All (1950).

In 1950 Barry began appearing on television with the NBC Television Opera Theatre. In 1955 he appeared on the CBS Television anthology series Appointment with Adventure.

In 1951 Barry was hired for his first movie, in the role of Dr. Frank Addison in The Atomic City (1952). In 1953 he was cast as Dr. Clayton Forrester in the science fiction film The War of the Worlds (1953). (Much later, Barry also made a cameo appearance in Steven Spielberg's remake of War of the Worlds (2005), along with his co-star Ann Robinson from the film of 1953.)

When the situation comedy Our Miss Brooks was given a change of format in 1955, Barry was cast in a recurring role as the physical education teacher Gene Talbot, the new romantic interest of series star Eve Arden. The show was canceled in 1956, but Barry's character—a ladies' man with expensive tastes—served as the model for three shows in which he later starred.

Bat Masterson, a fictionalized recounting of the life of the real-life U.S. Marshal, gambler, and gunman (Masterson's life as a writer and bon vivant occurred long after the time-frame featured in the series) was broadcast by NBC-TV from 1958 to 1961. (In 1990 Barry recreated the role of Bat Masterson for two episodes of Guns of Paradise along with Hugh O'Brian as Wyatt Earp and the following year in The Gambler Returns: The Luck of the Draw, also with O'Brian as Wyatt Earp.)

In his next TV series, Burke's Law, Barry played a millionaire homicide investigator who was chauffeured in his Rolls-Royce as he solved crimes. This series was broadcast on ABC-TV from September 20, 1963, to May 5, 1965. For his performance in it, Barry won the Golden Globe Award for Best Actor in 1965. In 1965–66, the final season of the series, the title of the show changed to Amos Burke, Secret Agent. In 1994 a revival of the Burke's Law series returned to television for two seasons on CBS. Barry again played in the title role, this time as a widower working with his son Peter (Peter Barton). According to his co-star Gary Conway, who played Det. Tilson in the original series, the two had a lot of fun, on and off camera, despite having some difficulties with each other. After Conway left the show, he remained friends with Barry until his acting mentor's death.

Barry's third TV series was The Name of the Game, in which he played the sophisticated publisher of a family of magazines, and was one of three lead characters. The other two lead actors were Robert Stack and Tony Franciosa, who rotated with Barry week by week as the primary character in each week's program. This series was shown by NBC from 1968 to 1971. One of the magazines that Barry's character published was called People, several years before the actual People began publication.

Shortly before the filming of The Name of the Game series began, Barry played the villain—a wealthy psychiatrist—in Prescription: Murder, the two-hour TV movie that became the precursor of the TV series Columbo.

In 1972, Barry starred in the ITV television series The Adventurer, along with Barry Morse and Catherine Schell. He played Gene Bradley, a government agent of independent means who posed as a glamorous American movie star.

Barry returned to Broadway acting on two occasions—in 1962 in The Perfect Setup and in 1983 in the Broadway premiere of the musical La Cage aux Folles. Barry was nominated for a Tony Award for his portrayal of Georges in Cage.

For his contribution to live theatre, Gene Barry received a star on the Hollywood Walk of Fame at 6555 Hollywood Boulevard. In 1975 Barry bought a home in Palm Springs, California. A Golden Palm Star on the Palm Springs Walk of Stars was dedicated to him in 1994.

Personal life
On October 22, 1944, at age 25, Barry married Betty Claire Kalb (1923–2003), whom he met on the set of Catherine Was Great. Kalb was an actress known by the stage name Julie Carson.

Death
Barry died on December 9, 2009 at Sunrise Senior Living in Woodland Hills, California, at the age of 90. He was buried at the Hillside Memorial Park Cemetery in Culver City, California, with his wife Betty, who died in 2003.

Filmography

 The Atomic City (1952) – Dr. Frank Addison
 The War of the Worlds (1953) – Dr. Clayton Forrester
 The Girls of Pleasure Island (1953) – Capt. Beaton
 Those Redheads From Seattle (1953, filmed in 3-D) – Johnny Kisco
 Alaska Seas (1954) – Verne Williams
 Red Garters (1954) – Rafael Moreno
 Naked Alibi (1954) – Al Willis
 Soldier of Fortune (1955) – Louis Hoyt
 The Purple Mask (1955) – Capt. Charles Laverne
 The Houston Story (1956) – Frank Duncan
 Back from Eternity (1956) – Jud Ellis
 China Gate (1957) – Sgt. Brock
 The 27th Day (1957) – Jonathan Clark
 Forty Guns (1957) – Wes Bonell
 Thunder Road (1958) – Troy Barrett
 Hong Kong Confidential (1958) – Agent Casey Reed
 Maroc 7 (1967) – Simon Grant
 Subterfuge (1968) – Michael A. Donovan
 The Second Coming of Suzanne (1974) – Jackson Sinclair, the TV Commentator
 Guyana: Crime of the Century (1979) – Congressman Leo Ryan
 Sahara (1983) – R.J. Gordon
 War of the Worlds (2005) – Grandfather (final film role)

Television credits

 Science Fiction Theatre (1955) – Joe Ferguson
 Our Miss Brooks (1955–1956) – Gene Talbot
 Alfred Hitchcock Presents (1955–1958)
 Playhouse 90 – Ain't No Time for Glory (1957) – Lt. Roy Koalton 
 The Walter Winchell File "The Witness" (1957) – Billy Peterson
 Bat Masterson (1958–1961) – Bat Masterson
 Pete and Gladys as himself in "Crossed Wires" (1961) – Himself
 Burke's Law (1963–1966) – Amos Burke, Secret Agent / Snooky Martinelli
 Columbo: Prescription: Murder (1968)
  (1968) – Michael London
 The Name of the Game (1968–1971) – Glenn Howard / Will Manning
 Do You Take This Stranger? (1971) – Murray Jarvis
 The Devil and Miss Sarah (1971) – Rankin
 The Adventurer (1972–1973) – Gene Bradley
 Ransom for Alice! (1977) – Harry Darew
 Aspen (1977) (miniseries) – Carl Osborne
 The Feather and Father Gang – "The Apology" (March 7, 1977) – Generalis
 Charlie's Angels – Angels In The Wings (November 23, 1977) – Frank Jason
 A Cry for Love (1980) – Gordon Harris
 The Girl, the Gold Watch & Dynamite (1981) – Andrew Stovall
 The Adventures of Nellie Bly (1981) – John Cockerill
 The Love Boat (1982) – Ted Anderson
 Crazy Like a Fox (1984-1986) – Nicholas Roland
 The Twilight Zone (1987) –  Prince of Darkness
 Perry Mason: The Case of the Lost Love (1987) – Glenn Robertson
 My Secret Identity (1988) – Fred Cooper / Captain Noble
 Turn Back the Clock (1989) – John Forrest
 Murder, She Wrote (1989) – Henry Reynard
 The Gambler Returns: The Luck of the Draw (1991) – Bat Masterson
 Burke's Law (1994–1995) – Chief Amos Burke
 These Old Broads (2001) – Mr. Stern

References

External links

 
 
 
 Gene Barry – Daily Telegraph obituary

1919 births
2009 deaths
Male actors from New York City
Male actors from Palm Springs, California
American male film actors
American male musical theatre actors
American male television actors
Western (genre) television actors
American people of Russian-Jewish descent
Jewish American male actors
20th-century American male actors
Burials at Hillside Memorial Park Cemetery
New York (state) Democrats
California Democrats
20th-century American singers
20th-century American male singers
New Utrecht High School alumni
American Ashkenazi Jews
20th-century American Jews
21st-century American Jews